Říkov is a municipality and village in Náchod District in the Hradec Králové Region of the Czech Republic. It has about 200 inhabitants.

History
The first written mention of Říkov is from 1366.

References

Villages in Náchod District